Andrei Radu (born 21 June 1996) is a Romanian professional footballer who plays as a left-back for Greek Super League club PAS Giannina.

Career

PAS Giannina
In February 2023 he moved to PAS Giannina in Superleague Greece.

Personal life
He is the cousin of goalkeeper Andrei Ionuț Radu.

Career statistics

Club

Honours
CFR Cluj
Supercupa României: 2018

References

External links
 
 

1996 births
Living people
Footballers from Bucharest
Romanian footballers
Association football defenders
Liga I players
Liga II players
FC Dinamo București players
LPS HD Clinceni players
CFR Cluj players
CS Concordia Chiajna players
FC Politehnica Iași (2010) players
Cypriot First Division players
Aris Limassol FC players
PAS Giannina F.C. players
Super League Greece players
Romania youth international footballers
Romania under-21 international footballers
Romanian expatriate footballers
Romanian expatriate sportspeople in Cyprus
Expatriate footballers in Cyprus
Romanian expatriate sportspeople in Greece
Expatriate footballers in Greece